Clinton Mola (born 15 March 2001), is an English professional footballer who plays as a defender or defensive midfielder for EFL Championship club Blackburn Rovers, on loan from VfB Stuttgart.

Club career
On 31 January 2020, Mola moved to VfB Stuttgart. Mola made his debut for Stuttgart on 5 February 2020 in the 2019–20 DFB-Pokal against Bayer 04 Leverkusen.

On 1 September 2022, Mola signed for EFL Championship club Blackburn Rovers on a season-long loan deal including an option to buy.

International career
Born in England, Mola is of Congolese descent. He is a youth international for England.

On 6 September 2021, Mola made a goalscoring debut for the England U20s during a 6–1 victory over Romania U20s at St. George's Park. 

On 4 October 2021, Mola received his first call up to the England U21s as an injury replacement for Levi Colwill.  On 16 November 2021, Mola made his U21 debut during a 3–2 defeat to Georgia in Batumi.

Career statistics

Club

References

2001 births
Living people
Footballers from the London Borough of Camden
English footballers
English sportspeople of Democratic Republic of the Congo descent
Association football midfielders
England youth international footballers
Chelsea F.C. players
VfB Stuttgart players
Blackburn Rovers F.C. players
2. Bundesliga players
Bundesliga players
Regionalliga players
English expatriate footballers
English expatriate sportspeople in Germany
Expatriate footballers in Germany
England under-21 international footballers